Sacchin may refer to:

Christopher Sacchin (born 1983), Italian swimmer
Sacchin, a member of Maria (Japanese band)
A nickname for Sayoko Nanamori, a character from RahXephon
A nickname for Satsuki Yumizuka, a character from Tsukihime